Paul Fang , is the current Chairman and President of Midea Group., a Fortune 500 company, and the largest producer of major appliances in the world.

Education 

Fang has earned a Bachelor's Degree in History from East China Normal University and an EMBA from the National University of Singapore.

Career 

Fang joined  Midea  in 1992, first in the Marketing Department, later being promoted to General Manager of the firm's Air Conditioning Business Department, followed by President of Midea Refrigeration Electric Appliances Group, and then Chairman and President of GD Midea Holding Co., Ltd.

In 2013, upon the retirement of Midea founder He Xiangjian, he was appointed as the Chairman and President of Midea Group Co., Ltd. (000333.SZ). He is also currently the chairman of the company’s subsidiary, Wuxi LittleSwan Co., Ltd. (000418.SZ).

References
 

Businesspeople from Anhui
Year of birth missing (living people)
Living people
National University of Singapore alumni
East China Normal University alumni